"200 Copas" (Spanish for "200 Cups") is a song by Colombian singer-songwriter Karol G. It was written by Karol G, Daniel Felix and Daniel Echavarría, and produced by Karol G and Ovy on the Drums. The song was released on July 13, 2021 through Universal Music Latino as the seventh and final single from her third studio album KG0516.

Background 

The song was first revealed through Karol G’s album track list announcement for her third studio album KG0516 on March 22, 2021. The song was released on March 25, 2021 with the release of the album. The official music video was released on July 13, 2021.

Critical reception 

Billboard stated: "As usual, Karol sounds great testing new waters. With "200 Copas", co-written by Ovy, Karol and corrido tumbado artist Danny Felix, Karol not only shares her best advice to a friend, but also accompanies her in her heartbreak."

Commercial performance 
"200 Copas" debuted at number 44 on the US Billboard Hot Latin Songs chart dated April 10, 2021. The song reached its peak at number 28 on the chart dated August 7, 2021. The song received a 3 times Latin platinum certification by the Recording Industry Association of America (RIAA) on November 24, 2021, for sales of 180,000 equivalent-units.

Music video 

The music video for "200 Copas" was directed by Cole Santiago and was released on Karol G’s YouTube channel on July 13, 2021. As of January 2023, it has over 230 million views and 1.8 million likes.

Charts

Certifications

Release history

References

2021 songs
2021 singles
Karol G songs
Spanish-language songs
Song recordings produced by Ovy on the Drums